Indiana's 7th congressional district special election of 2008 took place March 11, 2008 to fill the seat in the United States House of Representatives left vacant by the death of 7th district representative Julia Carson (D) on December 15, 2007. The election determined who would fill the vacancy for the rest of the 110th United States Congress. Indiana Gov. Mitch Daniels set the date for the special election. Both political parties had previously agreed to this date. Democrat André Carson won the election with an 18.17% voter turnout.

Candidates
On January 11, the Democratic caucus chose André Carson to run in the March 11 special election. On January 12, the Republicans chose Jon Elrod as their candidate and the Libertarian caucus nominated Sean Shepard.

Democratic
André Carson – Indianapolis City-County Council member, District 15, and Julia Carson's grandson
Ran for Nomination
Carolene Mays – State Representative, District 94
David Orentlicher – State Representative, District 86
Randle Pollard – Attorney
Michael Rodman – Marion County Treasurer
Joanne Sanders – Indianapolis City-County Council Minority leader, At-Large
Jeff White – John Marshall Middle School Principal
Frances Nelson Williams – Methodist Hospital Chaplain
Declined to Run
Frank J. Anderson – Marion County Sheriff
Carl Drummer – Center Township Trustee 
Woody Meyers – Former State Health Commissioner 
Bart Peterson – Former Indianapolis Mayor
Greg Porter – State Representative, District 96 
Robin Winston – Former State Party Chairman

Libertarian
Sean Shepard – Small business owner

Republican
Jon Elrod – State Representative, District 97
Ran for Nomination
Gabrielle Campo – Social worker
Thomas Rose – Radio talk show host and aide to former Mayor Stephen Goldsmith
Greg Stroude  – Real estate broker
Declined to Run
Eric Dickerson – Businessman, Julia Carson's 2006 challenger

Environment

The district, which covers most of Marion County, is considered difficult for Republicans. It includes most of what was the city of Indianapolis before the creation of Unigov in 1970, and includes most of the more Democratic areas of the county. John Kerry won the 7th district in 2004 with 58%, but after the November 2007 upset of Indianapolis Mayor Bart Peterson by Republican Greg Ballard, the race was assumed to be competitive. However, in the precincts of the 7th District Democrat Bart Peterson still received 54% of the votes.

Results

External links
André Carson for Congress
Jon Elrod's campaign site
Sean Shepard's campaign site

References

Indiana 2008 07
Indiana 2008 07
2008 07 Special
Indiana 07 Special
United States House of Representatives 07 Special
United States House of Representatives 2008 07